is a one-shot Japanese manga written by  and published by Seirindo. The manga consists of an anthology of unrelated stories on the darker side of life. The manga is licensed for an English-language release in North America by Ponent Mon and a French-language release in France by Casterman.

Reception
Mania.com's Janet Houck compares the anthology of stories in the manga with its respective endings with no conclusion to life in general.

References

External links
Kan Takahama on Japanese Wikipedia

Shōjo manga
2002 manga
Drama anime and manga